Union Springs is the name of two places in the United States of America:
Union Springs, Alabama
Union Springs, New York